The following list is all known Turkish television series sorted by year.

2023

2022

2021

2020

2019

2018

2017

2016

2015

2014

2013

2012

2011

2010

2009

2008

2007

2006

2000–2005

1975–1999

See also
 List of ended Turkish television series
 Despre Seriale ro

References
latest Turkish drama and updates

Turkey
 
 
Turkish television-related lists